Juan Díaz (died 1651) was a priest and friar of the Dominican Order known for writing the biography Vida y virtudes del venerable fray Andrés del Valle.

Díaz was born in Sonsonate, El Salvador and took his vows in Guatemala. Over the course of his career, he headed the Convento de Santo Domingo in Sonsonate and administered several towns including Escuintla, Guatemala.

Díaz was a follower of the friar Andrés del Valle, and his biography Vida y virtudes del venerable fray Andrés del Valle (Life and Virtues of the Venerable Friar Andrés del Valle) is a principal example of early Salvadoran literature.  The National Library of Guatemala holds the manuscript of this work.

Díaz died at an advanced age in Guatemala on October 17, 1651.

See also
Salvadoran literature

References

Year of birth unknown
1651 deaths
Salvadoran Roman Catholic priests
Guatemalan religious leaders
Salvadoran male writers
Guatemalan male writers
Members of the Dominican Order
People from Sonsonate Department